Something Tasty is an album by the Super Jazz Trio of pianist Tommy Flanagan, bassist Reggie Workman, and drummer Joe Chambers, with Art Farmer on flugelhorn.

Background
The Super Jazz Trio was formed in 1978 by pianist Tommy Flanagan, bassist Reggie Workman, and drummer Joe Chambers.

Music and recording
The album was recorded at Media Studio, Tokyo, on May 25, 1979.

Releases
It was released by the Japanese label Baystate. An SHM-CD edition was released on February 25, 2009, by BMG Japan.

Track listing
"Au Privave" – 6:28
"Blame It on My Youth" – 7:34
"My Heart Skips a Beat" – 6:00
"Here's That Rainy Day" – 5:53
"Stablemates" – 6:18
"It Might as Well Be Spring" – 9:45

Personnel
Art Farmer – flugelhorn
Tommy Flanagan – piano
Reggie Workman – bass
Joe Chambers – drums

References

1979 albums
Tommy Flanagan albums